Jack Brand (born 4 April 1953) is a former professional soccer goalkeeper. He holds the record for most shutouts in a season in the North American Soccer League with 15 in 1980. He was born in Braunschweig, West Germany. In 2008, Jack was inducted into the Canadian Soccer Hall of Fame

Soccer career
Brand began his senior club career with Toronto Hungaria of the National Soccer League in 1973. In 1974, he joined Toronto Metros of NASL and played 14 regular season games. In '75, he played 2 regular season and 1 play-off game for the Toronto Metros-Croatia. Brand returned to the NSL for 1976, helping Toronto Italia win the league championship. He returned to the NASL for '77, playing 26 regular season games and 5 play-off games for the Rochester Lancers. With the New York Cosmos in 1978, Brand appeared in 10 regular season and 5 play-off games, and was in goal as the Cosmos won Soccer Bowl '78 3–1 over Tampa Bay. The following season after 7 games changed teams and played 4 regular season and 5 play-off games for the Tulsa Roughnecks.

1980 was Brand's career year, playing with the Seattle Sounders. The Sounders went on to post a 25–7 win-lose record, constituting a NASL record for wins in a season. Brand was voted North American Player of the Year and NASL Second Team All-Star in posting a 0.91 GAA and 15 shutouts, also a league record. The following season though the team sputtered to a losing record. Brand played in 23 games. He concluded his NASL career playing 14 contests for the Tampa Bay Rowdies in 1982. In 1984, he played for F.C. Seattle in the F.C. Seattle Challenge Cup. He briefly served as coach of F.C. Seattle before being replaced by Bruce Rioch in February 1985.

Brand was earned his only senior 'A' as a 21-year-old on 28 October 1974 in Budapest in a 1–1 draw. He was Canada's goalkeeper in their home 1976 Summer Olympics. The team was eliminated in the first stage of the tournament, losing 1–2 to the Soviet Union and 1–3 to North Korea. In 6 pre-Olympic friendlies played in Canada in 1975, Brand and the Canucks conceded a whopping 25 goals in 6 losing contests played against the Olympic teams of Poland, Hungary, and East Germany.  He also was a member of the Canadian squad at the 1975 Pan American Games.

Personal
Brand comes from a sports family with his parents involved in track and field. He earned a commerce and finance degree from the University of Rochester. In 1978, Brand married his high school sweetheart, Birgit Leveloh. He currently lives in Toronto, where he runs his family's industrial felt company.

References
http://www.sportbuzzer.de/gallerie/jack-brand-von-wurzen-zu-cosmos-new-york/

External links
 / Canada Soccer Hall of Fame
 (Inactive as of 15 December 2007)
NASL stats

1953 births
Living people
Canadian expatriate sportspeople in the United States
Canadian expatriate soccer players
Canada men's international soccer players
Canadian soccer players
Expatriate soccer players in the United States
Olympic soccer players of Canada
Footballers at the 1976 Summer Olympics
Pan American Games competitors for Canada
Footballers at the 1975 Pan American Games
Seattle Storm (soccer) players
Association football goalkeepers
German emigrants to Canada
Naturalized citizens of Canada
New York Cosmos players
North American Soccer League (1968–1984) players
Soccer people from Ontario
Sportspeople from Braunschweig
Rochester Lancers (1967–1980) players
Seattle Sounders (1974–1983) players
Tampa Bay Rowdies (1975–1993) players
Toronto Italia players
Toronto Blizzard (1971–1984) players
Tulsa Roughnecks (1978–1984) players
University of Rochester alumni
West German emigrants
Western Soccer Alliance players
Canadian National Soccer League players
Footballers from Lower Saxony